UHU GmbH & Co. KG is a German manufacturer of adhesive products, based in Bühl, Germany. Its company slogan is "glues anything, anytime.".  The company logo is yellow with black lettering and in many markets it includes the German phrase: "" (the "everything-glue").

The products are now sold in over 125 countries around the world.

History 

In 1905, August Fischer, a dispensing chemist, purchased a small chemical plant aiming to manufacture inks, rubber stamp pads, paints and adhesives. In 1932, Fischer developed a clear synthetic resin adhesive which displayed the ability to affix almost any material. Following the custom of the time to name products in the writing goods sector after birds, Fischer named the glue UHU (pronounced "ooo-hoo", though in many English-speaking countries it is said "you-hoo") after Uhu, the onomatopeic German name for the eagle-owl, a bird which at the time could still be found in the Black Forest. There is an account of glue being used by British prisoners of war in Germany during WW2, and this is referred to by them as 'Uhu'. Another version of the origin of the company's name is that it supplied the glue in kits for a model airplane named "UHU" (Owl).  This model design was built by German youngsters for an annual contest named "" (the small owl) that began around 1950.  The contest was very popular, and the glue became a popular item with German hobbyists, so the name stuck.

In 1971, Fischer's company, renamed UHU after its leading product, was taken over by the Beecham Group of England (which subsequently became a part of GlaxoSmithKline), but regained independence for a few years after a management buyout in 1989.  In 1994, UHU became a totally owned subsidiary of the Bolton Group, an Italian manufacturer of branded consumer goods.

Guinness World Records 
The company has achieved one world record in Germany, in October 2007. A Ford pickup truck weighing about four tonnes was suspended from a crane with the help of UHU glue. Two steel parts  in diameter were glued together with an UHU derivative and were used to connect car and crane hook.

This record was subsequently beaten in March 2009 by the German firm Henkel, who lifted a similar Ford truck, this time with a Smart microcar in the back, giving a total weight of 5.02 tonnes.

References

External links 
 UHU GmbH & Co. KG homepage

Adhesives
Companies based in Baden-Württemberg
Chemical companies of Germany
German brands